Sitobion phyllanthi, also known as Sitobion (Sitobion) phyllanthi, is an aphid in the superfamily Aphidoidea in the order Hemiptera. It is a true bug and sucks sap from plants.

References 

 http://aphid.speciesfile.org/Common/basic/Taxa.aspx?TaxonNameID=1168766
 http://animaldiversity.org/accounts/Sitobion_phyllanthi/classification/

Agricultural pest insects
Macrosiphini